Beneficence is a 1937 bronze statue on the campus of Ball State University, located in Muncie, Indiana. The statue is referred to as Benny by students.

History
In 1927 the Muncie Chamber of Commerce proposed the building of a memorial to express gratitude on behalf of Muncie and Ball State University for the Ball Brothers' extensive generosity to the community. The monetary value of the Balls' philanthropies in Muncie totaled $7 million by the time of the monument's completion in 1937.

The Chamber commissioned renowned sculptor Daniel Chester French, who sculpted the statue of Abraham Lincoln in the Lincoln Memorial in Washington, D.C. The name Beneficence was chosen for the statue because it aptly described the feelings of the community and the actions of the Ball Brothers. French entrusted architect Richard Henry Dana to choose a location for the statue and to design the surrounding promenade.

The price tag for Beneficence, completed in 1930, was approximately $50,000. The progress toward installation crawled during the Great Depression, as funds for the project became scarce. More than 11,000 individuals donated money to assist in the completion of the memorial, and Beneficence was dedicated on September 26, 1937. Although the project was the last for French, neither he nor Dana lived to see its dedication. The statue, affectionately known as Benny, symbolizes the selflessness of the five brothers in their service to the community. It is so entwined in the university's culture that its image is part of the school seal.

Beneficences hand stretches to welcome new students to campus. The treasure box she holds in her other arm represents the treasure education can offer. Her wings represent the flight into the world that take place when students graduate. The five Corinthian columns behind the statue represent the Ball Brothers, for whom the university is named.

Beneficence resembles earlier examples of French's work such as Angel of the Waters, part of a memorial to businessman and philanthropist George Robert White located in the Boston Public Garden in Boston, Massachusetts, and The Spirit of Life, located in Saratoga Springs, New York.

Campus lore
Some students believe that one way to find one's true love is to sit under Benny and kiss him or her with closed eyes. If Bennys wings flap, then the love is true; if no flapping occurs, then the love is not meant to be. Another myth suggests that the severed heads of each of the five Ball Brothers rest in individual urns on the top of the respective pillar; however, all five brothers are buried at Beech Grove Cemetery in Muncie. Another legend states that a female student is not officially a coed until she is kissed by a male student beneath the statue. Another campus myth states if a virgin were to ever cross Bennys path she would come to life and fly away.

References

External links
 

1937 sculptures
Ball State University
Buildings and structures in Muncie, Indiana
Outdoor sculptures in Indiana
Sculptures by Daniel Chester French
1937 establishments in Indiana